Jonathan D'Aversa (born March 2, 1986) is a Canadian former professional ice hockey defenceman who played in the American Hockey League (AHL) with Wilkes-Barre/Scranton Penguins before spending the majority of his professional career in Europe.

Playing career
D'Aversa was an undrafted player who played for the Sudbury Wolves of the OHL. Serving as an assistant captain for the Wolves in the 2006–07 season, D'Aversa was third on the team in scoring and was selected to play in the OHL All-Star classic. In the play-offs he was ranked second in scoring for defensemen. After completing his junior years, D'Aversa was signed as a free agent to a three-year contract by the Pittsburgh Penguins on May 25, 2007.

In the 2007–08 season, D'Aversa spent time with the Penguins American Hockey League affiliate the Wilkes-Barre/Scranton Penguins and the Wheeling Nailers of the ECHL, representing the Nailers in the ECHL All-Star Game.

On July 11, 2010, D'Aversa left North America and signed a one-year contract with Augsburger Panther of the German Deutsche Eishockey Liga for the 2010–11 season. Despite scoring 33 points in 51 games, Augsburg missed the playoffs and on April 1, 2011, D'Aversa left to sign with fellow DEL club Kölner Haie.

After one season in Köln, d'Aversa transferred as a free agent to the neighbouring Austrian Hockey League with Dornbirner EC on August 4, 2012. He remained with the club until the end of the 2015-16 season. In April 2016, he penned a deal with another Austrian team, EHC Linz.

Following his third season with the Black Wings in 2018–19, D'Aversa opted to end his 12 year professional career and return to North America.

Career statistics

References

External links

1986 births
Living people
Augsburger Panther players
EHC Black Wings Linz players
Canadian ice hockey defencemen
Dornbirn Bulldogs players
Ice hockey people from Ontario
Kölner Haie players
Ontario Junior Hockey League players
Sportspeople from Richmond Hill, Ontario
Sudbury Wolves players
Wheeling Nailers players
Wilkes-Barre/Scranton Penguins players
Canadian expatriate ice hockey players in Austria
Canadian expatriate ice hockey players in Germany